The Seawolf class is a class of nuclear-powered, fast attack submarines (SSN) in service with the United States Navy. A fleet of 29 submarines was to be built over a ten-year period, but that was reduced to 12 submarines. The end of the Cold War and budget constraints led to the cancellation of any further additions to the fleet in 1995, leaving the Seawolf class limited to just three boats. This, in turn, led to the design of the smaller . The Seawolf class cost about $3 billion per unit ($3.5 billion for ), making it the most expensive United States Navy fast attack submarine and second most expensive submarine ever, after the French  nuclear-powered ballistic missile submarines.

Design 
Seawolf-class hulls are constructed from HY-100 steel, which is stronger than the HY-80 steel employed in previous classes, in order to withstand water pressure at greater depths.

Seawolf-class submarines are larger, faster, and significantly quieter than previous Los Angeles-class submarines; they also carry more weapons and have twice as many torpedo tubes. The boats are able to carry up to 50 UGM-109 Tomahawk cruise missiles for attacking land and sea surface targets. The boats also have extensive equipment to allow shallow water operations. The class uses the more advanced ARCI Modified AN/BSY-2 combat system, which includes a larger spherical sonar array, a wide aperture array (WAA), and a new towed-array sonar. Each boat is powered by a single S6W nuclear reactor, delivering  to a low-noise pump-jet.

As a result of their advanced design, however, Seawolf-class submarines were much more expensive. The projected cost for 12 submarines of this class was $33.6 billion, but construction was stopped at three boats when the Cold War ended.

Variants 
 is roughly  longer than the other two boats of her class, due to the insertion of a section known as the Multi-Mission Platform (MMP) which allows launch and recovery of remotely operated underwater vehicles (ROV) and Navy SEALs. The MMP may also be used as an underwater splicing chamber for tapping of undersea fiber optic cables. This role was formerly filled by the now decommissioned . Jimmy Carter was modified for this role by General Dynamics Electric Boat at the cost of $887 million.

Boats in class

See also
 List of submarine classes of the United States Navy
 List of submarines of the United States Navy
 List of submarine classes in service
 Submarines in the United States Navy
 Cruise missile submarine
 Attack submarine

References 

Submarine classes
Naval ships of the United States